Osorgino is a rural locality (a village) in Taptykovsky Selsoviet, Ufimsky District, Bashkortostan, Russia. The population was 238 as of 2010. There are 20 streets.

Geography 
Osorgino is located 31 km southwest of Ufa (the district's administrative centre) by road. Yengalyshevo is the nearest rural locality.

References 

Rural localities in Ufimsky District